The , or the Amur River Society, was a prominent paramilitary, ultranationalist group in Japan.

History

The Kokuryūkai was founded in 1901 by  martial artist Uchida Ryohei as a successor to his mentor Mitsuru Tōyama's Gen'yōsha. Its name is derived from the translation of the Amur River, which is called Heilongjiang or "Black Dragon River" in Chinese (黑龍江?), read as Kokuryū-kō in Japanese. Its public goal was to support efforts to keep the Russian Empire north of the Amur River and out of East Asia.

The Kokuryūkai initially made strenuous efforts to distance itself from the criminal elements of its predecessor, the Gen'yōsha. As a result, its membership included Cabinet Ministers and high-ranking military officers as well as professional intelligence operatives. However, as time passed, it found the use of criminal activities to be a convenient means to an end for many of its operations.

The Society published a journal, the Kokuryū Kaiho (Amur Bulletin) and operated an espionage training school, from which it dispatched agents to gather intelligence on Russian activities in Russia, Manchuria, Korea and China. Ikki Kita was sent to China as a special member of the organization. It also pressured Japanese politicians to adopt a strong foreign policy. The Kokuryūkai also supported Pan-Asianism, and lent financial support to revolutionaries such as Sun Yat-sen and Emilio Aguinaldo.

During the Russo-Japanese War, annexation of Korea and Siberian Intervention, the Imperial Japanese Army made use of the Kokuryūkai network for espionage, sabotage and assassination. They organized Manchurian guerrillas against the Russians from the Chinese warlords and bandit chieftains in the region, the most important being Marshal Zhang Zuolin. The Black Dragons waged a very successful psychological warfare campaign in conjunction with the Japanese military, spreading disinformation and propaganda throughout the region. They also acted as interpreters for the Japanese army.

The Kokuryūkai assisted the Japanese spy, Colonel Motojiro Akashi. Akashi, who was not directly a member of the Black Dragons, ran successful operations in China, Manchuria, Siberia and established contacts throughout the Muslim world. These contacts in Central Asia were maintained through World War II. The Black Dragons also formed close contact and even alliances with Buddhist sects throughout Asia.

During the 1920s and 1930s, the Kokuryūkai  evolved into more of a mainstream political organization, and publicly attacked liberal and leftist thought. Although it never had more than several dozen members  at any one time during this period, the close ties of its membership to leading members of the government, military and powerful business leaders gave it a power and influence far greater than most other ultranationalist groups. In 1924, retired naval captain Yutaro Yano and his associates within the Black Dragon Society invited Oomoto leader Onisaburo Deguchi on a journey to Mongolia. Onisaburo led a group of Oomoto disciples, including Aikido founder Morihei Ueshiba.

Initially directed only against Russia, in the 1930s, the Kokuryūkai expanded its activities around the world, and stationed agents in such diverse places as Ethiopia, Turkey, Morocco, throughout Southeast Asia and South America, as well as Europe and the United States.

The Kokuryūkai was officially disbanded by order of the American Occupation authorities in 1946. According to Brian Daizen Victoria's book, Zen War Stories, the Black Dragon Society was reconstituted in 1961 by Ōmori Sōgen as the Black Dragon Club (Kokuryū-Kurabu) with the aim to "succeed to the spirit of the [prewar] Black Dragon Society and promote the [Shōwa] restoration." According to Victoria, the Kokuryū-Kurabu never attracted more than 150 members.

Activities in the United States
The Ethiopian Pacific Movement and the Peace Movement of Ethiopia (both African-American black nationalist organizations) claimed they were affiliated with the Black Dragon Society.

As part of their effort to support such organizations, the Black Dragon Society sent an agent, Satokata Takahashi, to promote pan-Asianism and claim that Japan would treat them as racial equals. He would become a patron of Noble Drew Ali and the Moorish Science Temple of America, Elijah Muhammed and the Nation of Islam, as well as the Pacific Movement of the Eastern World. Sankichi Takahashi may have also been a member.

Mittie Maude Lena Gordon, who lead the Peace Movement of Ethiopia, claimed to be personally affiliated with the Kokuryūkai.

On March 27, 1942, FBI agents arrested members of the Black Dragon Society in the San Joaquin Valley, California.

In the Manzanar Internment Camp, a small group of pro-Imperial Japanese flew Black Dragon flags and intimidated other Japanese inmates.

See also 
 Fifth column
 Kinoaki Matsuo
 G-Men vs. the Black Dragon (1943)
 Kōtarō Yoshida
 Sakurakai
 Secret society
 Uyoku dantai

References

Bibliography 

 Deacon, Richard (1983). Kempei Tai: A History of the Japanese Secret Service. New York: Berkley Publishing Company. .
 Jacob, Frank (2012). Die Thule-Gesellschaft und die Kokuryûkai: Geheimgesellschaften im global-historischen. Würzburg: Königshausen & Neumann. .
 Jacob, Frank, ed. (2012). Geheimgesellschaften: Kulturhistorische Sozialstudien (Secret Societies: Comparative Studies in Culture, Society and History). Würzburg: Königshausen & Neumann. .
 Jacob, Frank (2014). Japanism, Pan-Asianism and Terrorism: A Short History of the Amur Society (The Black Dragons), 1901-1945. Palo Alto: Academica Press. .
 Kaplan, David, and Alec Dubro (2004). Yakuza: Japan's Criminal Underworld. Berkeley: University of California Press. pp. 18–21. .
 Polmar, Norman, and Thomas B. Allen (1997). Spy Book: The Encyclopedia of Espionage. New York: Random House. .
 Saaler, Sven (2011). "The Kokuryûkai, 1901-1920" (Chapter 10). In: Saaler, Sven, and Christopher W. A. Szpilman, eds. Pan-Asianism: A Documentary History, Vol. 1: 1859-1920. Lanham: Rowman and Littlefield, pp. 121–132.
 Saaler, Sven (2014). "The Kokuryûkai (Black Dragon Society) and the Rise of Nationalism, Pan-Asianism, and Militarism in Japan, 1901-1925." International Journal of Asian Studies, vol. 11, no. 2, pp. 125–160. .

External links 
 The "Black-Dragon" Statement of Japanese Policy in China as a Result of the European War (1914)

Politics of the Empire of Japan
Far-right politics in Japan
Political organizations based in Japan
Japanese militarism
Political parties established in 1901
Organizations disestablished in 1946
Japanese-American history
Internment of Japanese Americans
1901 establishments in Japan
1946 disestablishments in Japan
Japanese secret societies
Pan-Asianism